Diet of Croatia may refer to:

 Croatian Parliament
 Croatian cuisine